GovHack is Australia's largest open government and open data hackathon, attracting in excess of 1000 participants each year. First run as a small Canberra-based event in 2009, it has quickly expanded  to a national competition with simultaneous events taking place in major cities across the country each year. Available prizemoney has similarly increased, with a total prize pool of $70,000 available in 2014.

The event requires small teams of competitors to produce any kind of "hack" using Australian government data in around 46 hours, from Friday evening to Sunday afternoon. The format of a "hack" is unspecified, but the most common are web applications, mobile applications, or visualisations. Together with all source code deposited in an open source repository and open-licensed, each team is judged on a three-minute video they must produce, demonstrating what they have produced and its future potential.

Although competitors may use any available open government data, certain prize categories mandate the use of certain datasets, such as "Best Geoscience Award" or "Best Use of Taxation Statistics Award". Typically, participating government departments  federal, state or municipal  release special datasets just in time for the competition each year, with an associated prize.

The event is run by volunteers, particularly the Australian chapter of the Open Knowledge Foundation, and was originally led by Pia Waugh, as head of the national team.

Previous Events

GovHack 2018
The 2018 event is scheduled to take place later in the year than previous events, running 7–9 September.

GovHack 2017
The 2017 event ran on the weekend of 28–30 July. Over 2,300 participants competed across 36 locations, submitting 379 projects.

GovHack 2016
In 2016, GovHack ran on the weekend of 29–31 July.  Over 3000 participants competed across 40 locations, submitting 480 projects.

GovHack 2015
The 2015 event ran on 3–5 July in 31 locations across Australia and New Zealand, attracting over 1800 participants with over $120,000 in prizes.

GovHack 2014

The 2014 event had locations in Ballarat, Brisbane, Canberra, Cairns, Gold Coast, Hobart, Melbourne, Perth, Sydney, Adelaide and Mt Gambier. Winners of the national prizes were flown to a special "red carpet" event in Brisbane on 10 August.

GovHack 2013
The 2013 event had $170,000 in prizemoney, 134 teams entered, and 108 completed videos.

External links
Data Point (The Age blog)

References

Open data
Hackathons
Open government
Hacker culture
Computer-related events